"Yimou girls" is a nickname for actresses who received media attention through starring in a movie directed by Zhang Yimou.

In the early Zhang Yimou movies, the actresses Gong Li and Zhang Ziyi benefited from their roles. Afterwards, they gained media attention and became international movie stars. The fame of these first two stars led to the title of “Yimou girls” by both the media and the public. Continuing the legacy with Dong Jie and Li Man, the popularity of the nickname rose sharply, although they themselves did not reach the same level of the prior two actresses. In addition, Tang Yan, Wang Jia, Lin Miaoke and others were also named as “Yimou girls” by some media for promotional reasons because they participated in the opening and closing ceremonies of the Olympic Games which were directed by Zhang Yimou. 

Another common feature of the girls is that they were unknown before they appeared in Zhang Yimou's film. Gong Li, Zhang Ziyi and Li Man are students of the Central Academy of Drama. Dong Jie and Zhang Huiwen are dance actresses, Qu Ying is a model, Zhou Dongyu is a high school student, Ni Ni is a college student majoring in broadcasting, Wei Minzhi is of an ordinary rural background. 

Cheung Man-yuk was already famous for her frequent collaboration with director Wong Kar-wai before she starred in Zhang Yimou's films in 2002 Hero. Sun Li was known as a famous Television actress before she appeared in Shadow (2018), Guan Xiaotong was already a famous child actress. Qin Hailu was famous for her longest TV and movie career.

List

See also
Bond girl
Sing girls
Cinema of Hong Kong
Cinema of China

References

Living people
Cinema of China
21st-century Chinese actresses
Year of birth missing (living people)